The American rubyspot (Hetaerina americana) is a damselfly of the family Calopterygidae.
Males have a lustrous red head and thorax. The abdomen of both genders is brilliant green.
The female may have either green or copper colored marks on the thorax.

During mating, a male uses claspers at the end of his abdomen to grab a female behind the head, and the female bends her abdomen to engage segments 2–3 of the male, where sperm is stored, forming a "wheel" or "valentine". The male forcefully expels sperm stored by the female from prior matings before injecting his own.

Etymology 
The name highlights this damselfly's status as the most widespread of the North American rubyspots.
It is reported from all of the lower 48 US states except Washington and Idaho, and is also found in Mexico and southern and eastern Canada.

References 

Calopterygidae
Odonata of North America
Insects described in 1798